The thistle tortoise beetle (Cassida rubiginosa) is a species of leaf beetle, situated in the subfamily Cassidinae (tortoise beetles) and the genus Cassida.

Description

Cassida rubiginosa measures 6.0–8.0 mm in length. Like all Cassida its head is covered by the pronotum and the elytra has a wide flange surrounding it. This species is highly rounded, with green or yellowish-green elytra, sometimes with a small dark triangular spot around the scutellum. 
The common name may be misleading for the identification of this species as "rubiginosus" is Latin for "rusty or rust-coloured").

Flagellum
The flagellum (male sex organ) of C. rubiginosa is actually longer than its body — the organ is also very thin and curved at the end. The beetle needs such an organ because of the shape of the female reproductive organ, which includes a coiled duct that the male must penetrate. These physical properties were studied in a 2017 research project because the mechanically challenging ability of a thin structure to penetrate without buckling or rupturing may have important implications for the development of catheters in modern medicine.

Distribution
The thistle tortoise beetle is native to Eurasia and has been recorded in Britain. The beetle was intentionally introduced to Virginia in the United States to control thistles. It has spread throughout the northern United States and southern Canada, reaching as far south as Colorado. C. rubiginosa was introduced to New Zealand in 2006 for use as a biological control agent.

Diet and habitat

Cassida rubiginosa feeds on various Asteraceae, including thistles and many others. The adults are usually found on the underside of the leaves, the larvae on the uppersides.
Adults may also feed on pollen of buttercups and ox-eye daisies. The beetle's consumption of these plants is facilitated by a symbiotic relationship with the bacterial symbiont Stammera, which is housed in specialised structures within the foregut and allows the beetle to digest pectin, which is indigestible to most animals.

As a biological control agent
Cassida rubiginosa was introduced to New Zealand for use as a biological control agent against Cirsium arvense (Canada thistle) in 2006.
It is estimated that Canada thistle costs landowners around $32 million per year in Otago and Southland alone.

In terms of its efficacy as a control agent for Canada thistle; in dry years in Virginia, United States, five parasite-free beetles per plant have been shown to reduce above ground thistle biomass by 88%, with only 25% of these plants surviving to the end of the following year. In wet years the impact was less but still substantial. The beetle has subsequently been traded around New Zealand as a control agent. For example, in 2016 beetles collected from Ngaruawahia were released in Duder Regional Park in exchange for a group of the adult beetle Neolema ogloblin, which is a biological control agent for Tradescantia fluminensis.

References

External links
Global biodiversity information

Cassidinae
Beetles of Europe
Insects used for control of invasive plants
Biological pest control beetles
Beetles described in 1776